E636 may refer to:
 Maltol, a flavour enhancer
 FS class E636, an Italian locomotives class